Dance Vault Remixes: Get It Off/Knock Knock- Remix EP is the first EP by American R&B singer Monica, released in 2004 (see 2004 in music). It features remix-versions of the 2003 songs : "Knock Knock" and song "Get It Off" both from After the Storm in the U.S. Both songs were released as a double A-side and B-side single. It is her first compilation/EP album. It was released for promotional use only.

During 2004, her record company, J Records, issued a 6-track remix EP entitled Dance Vault Remixes: Get It Off/Knock Knock. The album features productions of Kid Chris and Planet Funk Crew. The dance mixes tracks on Dance Vault Remixes: Get It Off/Knock Knock saw minor success with just being an internet release. The album was to promoted the single and promoted by the Knock Knock/Get It Off- DVD Single.

Track listing
Get It Off (That Kid Chris Club Mix) - 8:15
Knock Knock (Planet Funk Club Mix) - 8:27
Get It Off (That Kid Chris Mixshow Edit) - 5:51
Get It Off (That Kid Chris Dub) - 8:56
Knock Knock (Planet Funk Dub Mix) - 8:36
Get It Off (That Kid Chris Radio Edit) - 4:03

References

Monica (singer) albums
2004 EPs
2004 remix albums
Remix EPs
J Records remix albums
J Records EPs